Mediaset Infinity (formerly Mediaset Play and Mediaset Play Infinity) is an Italian streaming platform for viewing streaming content via the Internet, both live and on demand. The platform is published by RTI and owned by Mediaset. It is also available as an app for Android, iOS and for Smart TVs with MHP or HbbTV technology.

History

Background 
The first Mediaset website was activated in 1999 under the name Mediaset.it. Initially it was a television portal dedicated to Canale 5, Rete 4 and Italia 1. Over the years it has been extended to all Mediaset networks. It was possible to access the TV guide, the complete list of Mediaset programs and information on DTT coverage. This platform was flanked by Video Mediaset, where there were clips, entire episodes of the programs and live news broadcasts.

Mediaset On Demand 
In March 2017 Mediaset On Demand was launched. On this you could follow the live broadcast of the channels, look at the programs already aired, and there were also several sections dedicated to news, web exclusives, film previews and interviews. An app for smartphones and tablets was also available, where it was possible to watch live programs or watch reruns, the TV guide, and vote in reality shows via televoting.

Mediaset Play 
Mediaset Play was born on July 5, 2018 as the heir of Mediaset On Demand, also incorporating the sites of free television channels and introducing some new functions that are added to those already existing in the previous portal. One of these is Restart, which allows you to review from the beginning the program that is airing at a given moment on a television channel of the group.

Mediaset Play Infinity 
On December 2, 2020 the merger between Mediaset Play and Infinity TV is announced. On 5 March 2021 it was confirmed that the streaming service would change its name to Infinity+, while the entire platform would be renamed Mediaset Play Infinity. The rebranding took place on the following 8 April, with a relative update of the logo and, consequently, of the graphic interface.

On April 2, 2021, the launch of Toonami is announced, a network published by WarnerMedia dedicated to Japanese anime and aimed at a mainly adolescent audience. The channel will arrive on Infinity+ at a cost of 4.99 euros per month.

Mediaset Infinity 
On May 17, 2021 the platform changed its name and logo to Mediaset Infinity, keeping the same features.

References

External links 
 

Mediaset
Video on demand services